Alice Noháčová (born 20 June 1967) is a Czech former professional tennis player.

Biography
Born in Prague, Noháčová started out on the professional tour in the late 1980s. From 1989, she began making the main draw of WTA Tour events, where she featured mostly as a doubles player. She was ranked as high as 115 in the world for doubles and twice reached the semifinals of the Linz Open. Her best performance at Grand Slam level was a second-round appearance in the women's doubles at the 1991 Wimbledon Championships, partnering Iva Budařová.

Noháčová was previously married to Czech tennis player David Rikl. Together they had two sons, Philip and Patrik. The youngest, Patrik, was a top junior player, winning the 2016 French Open boys' doubles title.

ITF finals

Doubles (4–7)

References

External links
 
 

1967 births
Living people
Czechoslovak female tennis players
Czech female tennis players
Tennis players from Prague